Francis H. Russell (October 1, 1904 – March 31, 1989) was an American diplomat who served as the United States Ambassador to New Zealand from 1957 to 1960, the United States Ambassador to Ghana from 1961 to 1962 and the United States Ambassador to Tunisia from 1962 to 1969.  He was the father of sociologist Arlie Russell Hochschild.

He died of a heart attack on March 31, 1989, in St. Petersburg, Florida at age 84.

Russell graduated from Tufts University and Harvard Law School.

References

1904 births
1989 deaths
Ambassadors of the United States to New Zealand
Ambassadors of the United States to Ghana
Ambassadors of the United States to Tunisia
Tufts University alumni
Harvard Law School alumni
United States Foreign Service personnel
20th-century American diplomats